In chemical thermodynamics, an exergonic reaction is a chemical reaction where the change in the free energy is negative (there is a net release of free energy). This indicates a spontaneous reaction if the system is closed and initial and final temperatures are the same. For processes that take place in a closed system at constant pressure and temperature, the Gibbs free energy is used, whereas the Helmholtz energy is relevant for processes that take place at constant volume and temperature. Any reaction occurring at constant temperature without input of electrical or photon energy is exergonic, according to the second law of thermodynamics. An example is cellular respiration.

Symbolically, the release of free energy, in an exergonic reaction (at constant pressure and temperature) is denoted as

Although exergonic reactions are said to occur spontaneously, this does not imply that the reaction will take place at an observable rate. For instance, the disproportionation of hydrogen peroxide releases free energy but is very slow in the absence of a suitable catalyst. It has been suggested that eager would be a more intuitive term in this context.

More generally, the terms exergonic and endergonic relate to the free energy change in any process, not just chemical reactions. By contrast, the terms exothermic and endothermic relate to an enthalpy change in a closed system during a process, usually associated with the exchange of heat.

See also
Endergonic reaction

References

Thermochemistry
Thermodynamic processes